Manchester Memorial High School is a four-year comprehensive school in Manchester, New Hampshire, with an enrollment of approximately 1,600. It is a part of the Manchester School District. The school's Latin motto is "scientia est potentia."

Manchester Memorial accepts students from Manchester.

History
Manchester Memorial High School was designed by two Manchester architecture firms: chief designers Dirsa & Lampron assisted by Koehler & Isaak. Construction began in 1959 and the school was opened in 1960.

Previously the majority of the high school students in Auburn were sent to Manchester Memorial.

In 2011, the town of Auburn voted to change its high school to Pinkerton Academy in Derry, and this transfer should be done within the next two years. In 2013 Hooksett and Manchester schools agreed to end their contract for Hooksett students to attend Manchester schools.

Academics
Manchester Memorial High School (MMHS) has received accreditation from the New England Association of Schools and Colleges and from the New Hampshire Department of Education.  Manchester Memorial offers vocational education courses at the Manchester School of Technology

The school has a variety of Advanced Placement Program classes. As of the 2014–2015 school year these included AP Biology, AP Calculus, AP Chemistry, AP English Literature, AP English Language, AP Latin: Vergil, AP Physics, AP Studio Art, AP Government, AP Statistics, and AP Economics.

Demographics
The demographic breakdown of the 1849 students enrolled for the 2012–2013 school year was:

Male – 50.4%
Female – 49.6%
Native American/Alaskan – 0.6%
Asian/Pacific islander – 4.1%
Black – 6.3%
Hispanic – 11.8%
White – 72.8%
Multiracial – 4.4%

Additionally, 35.9% of the students were eligible for free or reduced lunch prices.

Athletics
Memorial High School is a member of the New Hampshire Interscholastic Athletic Association (NHIAA). It participates in Division I for all sports.

The Crusaders won the Division I hockey state champions in 1978, 1989, 1991, 1995 and 2013.

In 2006 the baseball team won the Class L state championship. It was the first title for Memorial in any team sport since the baseball team won the Division I title in 1998.

History
Memorial High opened in 1960.  Originally, the school had a statue of a crusader (the school's mascot) outside the administrative office, but this was stolen in the first year and was never replaced.

In 1992, the first annual FIRST Robotics Competition was held in the gymnasium. FIRST is a robotics competition in which high school students design and build robots to play a game. The first one was held in the gymnasium, but has grown into an international competition involving 5,000 teams across 3 leagues (FIRST Lego League, FIRST Tech Challenge, and FIRST Robotics Competition) from over 30 countries. The FIRST Championship is now held annually in both Houston, Texas, at the George R. Brown Convention Center, Toyota Center, and Minute Maid Park, and in Detroit, Michigan at Cobo Center and Ford Field.

Notable alumni

 Robert A. Baines, 3-term mayor of Manchester, New Hampshire
 Steve Balboni, Major League Baseball player (New York Yankees, Kansas City Royals, Texas Rangers, Seattle Mariners)
 Gen. Robert W. Cone, United States Army, Commanding Officer of III Corps (United States)
 Joyce Craig, 2-term mayor of Manchester, first female mayor 
 Mike Flanagan, pitcher and Cy Young Award winner with the Baltimore Orioles
 Don Florence, pitcher with the New York Mets
 Dan Goonan, Chief, Manchester Fire Department
 Chris Lambert, pitcher with the St. Louis Cardinals, Detroit Tigers, Baltimore Orioles
 Hubie McDonough III (hockey), (New York Rangers)
 Chuck Smyrl (football), (Cleveland Browns)

References

Memorial High School
Public high schools in New Hampshire